Joan Gerber (July 29, 1935 – August 22, 2011) was an American voice actress who provided voices for a variety of cartoons.

Her most challenging voice role was "all the children in a Japanese train wreck" for a Godzilla television episode. She voiced Freddy the Flute for H.R. Pufnstuf, which she identified as a favorite role. She also voiced the Queen of Oz in the animated cartoon Dorothy in the Land of Oz. She was described as talented and possessing a "golden throat" and a "splendid singing voice". She also voiced a syndicated series of roughly one-minute radio spots, "The Story Lady," that parodied children's programming.

Personal life and death
She had one daughter from her marriage to Frank Dowse. She later dated fellow actor Regis Cordic.

Gerber died on August 22, 2011, at the age of 76.<ref
name=SAG>Profile, Screen Actor's Guild Magazine, Vol. 52, No. 3, pg. 76 (Fall 2011).</ref>

Filmography

 1959: Matty's Funday Funnies (TV series): Additional Voices 1960: The Bugs Bunny Show (TV series): Additional voices 1965: Roger Ramjet (TV series): Dee / Lotta Love (voice)
 1965: Corn on the Cop: Granny, Ghost Trick-or-Treater (voice)
 1966: The Pique Poquette of Paris: Woman (voice)
 1966: The Super 6 (TV series, voice)
 1968: Mitzi (TV)
 1969: The Pink Panther Show, (TV, "voices")
 1969 Sesame Street (TV series): Voices
 1969: H.R. Pufnstuf (TV series): Freddie the Flute, Grandmother Clock (voice)
 1970: Pufnstuf (film) : Freddie the Flute, Dowager Tree, Granddaughter Clock (voice)
 1970: Shinbone Alley (voice)
 1970: Lancelot Link, Secret Chimp (TV series): Mata Hairi (voice)
 1970: Tales of Washington Irving (TV, voice)
 1970:  The Bugaloos (TV, various)
 1971:  Lidsville (TV, various)
 1971: The Point! (TV, voice)
 1971: Arnold's Closet Revue (TV)
 1971: Help!... It's the Hair Bear Bunch! (TV series, voice)
 1972: Wait Till Your Father Gets Home (TV series): Sara Whitaker / Irma Boyle (voice)
 1972: Bury Me an Angel: Op's Voice (voice)
 1972: The Barkleys (TV series): Agnes Barkley/ Lulu (voice)
 1972: The New Scooby-Doo Movies (TV series)
 1972: The Houndcats (TV series): Various (voice)
 1973: Kloot's Kounty: Shepherdess (voice)
 1973: The Boa Friend (voice)
 1973: Charlotte's Web: Mrs. Zuckerman / Mrs. Fussy (voice)
 1974: The Badge and the Beautiful (voice)
 1974: The Magical Mystery Trip Through Little Red's Head (TV): Mother / Adeline / Diane (voice)
 1974: The Nine Lives of Fritz the Cat (voice)
 1974: These Are the Days (TV series, voice)
 1974: Partridge Family 2200 A.D. (TV series): Shirley Partridge (voice)
 1975: M–O–N–E–Y Spells Love (voice)
 1975: Goldilox & the Three Hoods (voice)
 1975: The Oddball Couple (TV series): Goldie (voice)
 1976: The Scooby-Doo/Dynomutt Hour (TV series, voice)
 1976: Clue Club (TV series)
 1976: The Pink Panther Laugh and the Half Hour and Half Show (TV series): Various characters (voice)
 1977: Fred Flintstone and Friends (TV series, voice)
 1977: I Am the Greatest: The Adventures of Muhammad Ali (TV series, voice)
 1977: CB Bears (TV series): Various (voice)
 1977: The Mouse and His Child: The Elephant (voice)
 1978: Dynomutt, Dog Wonder (TV series): Additional Voices (voice)
 1978: Jana of the Jungle (TV series, voice)
 1978: Fantastic Four (TV series, voice)
 1978: The Puppy Who Wanted a Boy (TV, voice)
 1978: The All-New Pink Panther Show (TV series, voice)
 1978: The All New Popeye Hour (TV series, voice)
 1978: Christmas at Walt Disney World (TV): Evil Fairy (voice)
 1979: J-Men Forever (voice)
 1979: The Puppy's Great Adventure (TV, voice)
 1979: Nutcracker Fantasy: Mice (voice)
 1979: Scooby-Doo and Scrappy-Doo (1979 TV series) (TV series): Lefty Callahan / Vampire Lady of the Bay / Mrs. Cornell (voice)
 1979: Scooby-Doo Goes Hollywood (TV): Lavonne / Second Woman / Waitress (voice)
 1980: Thanksgiving in the Land of Oz: Tic Toc / Ozma (voice)
 1980: The Richie Rich/Scooby-Doo Hour (TV series): Mrs. Regina Rich / Irona the Maid (voice)
 1981: Strawberry Shortcake in Big Apple City (TV): Apricot, Blueberry Muffin, Apple Dumplin' (voice)
 1981: The Kwicky Koala Show (TV series, voice)
 1981: The Smurfs (TV series, voice)
 1982: Strawberry Shortcake: Pets on Parade 1982: Puff and the Incredible Mr. Nobody (TV, voice)
 1982: Heidi's Song: Rottenmeier (voice)
 1983: The Dukes (TV series, voice)
 1983: Monchhichis (TV series, voice)
 1983: Peter and the Magic Egg (TV) Mama Doppler / Feathers / Queen Bessie / Mother Nature (voice)
 1984: Snorks (TV series): Mrs. Kelp (voice)
 1985: Explorers: Special Vocal Effects (voice)
 1985: The 13 Ghosts of Scooby-Doo (TV series, voice)
 1986: The Bugs Bunny and Tweety Show (TV series): Various Characters (voice)
 1987: DuckTales: Treasure of the Golden Suns (TV movie): Mrs. Beakley / Skiddles' Mother (voice)
 1987: DuckTales (TV series): Mrs. Bentina Beakley, Glittering Goldie, additional Voices (voice)
 1987: Teenage Mutant Ninja Turtles: Shreeka, additional Voices (voice)
 1988: Scooby-Doo and the Reluctant Werewolf (TV): Dreadonia, Woman at Store (voice)
 1988: Street of Dreams (TV)
 1989: Super DuckTales (TV movie): Mrs. Beakley (voice)
 1990: Tiny Toon Adventures: Gotcha Grabmore (voice)
 1990: DuckTales the Movie: Treasure of the Lost Lamp: Mrs. Beakley (voice)
 1990: Gravedale High (TV series, voice)
 1990: TaleSpin (TV series): Helga (voice)
 1992: Capitol Critters (TV series): Additional Voices (voice)
 1993: Goof Troop (TV series)
 1993: I Yabba-Dabba Do! (TV): Additional Voices (voice)
 1994: A Flintstones Christmas Carol: Additional Voices (voice)
 1995: That's Warner Bros.! (TV series): Various characters (voice)
 1996: The Bugs n' Daffy Show (TV series): Various Characters (voice)
 1999: The Stan Freberg Commercials (video): (segment "Hitchcock Spoof")
 2003: Duck Dodgers (TV series): Klunkin Woman (voice)

References

External links
 
 Joan Gerber at Voice Chasers.com

1935 births
2011 deaths
American voice actresses
Actresses from Detroit
21st-century American women
20th-century American women